Attack of the Weirdos is the debut extended play by Detroit rapper and D12 member Bizarre. It was released on September 1, 1998 via Federation Records.

Audio production of the seven track album was handled by local Detroit deejays and producers such as DJ Head, who was D12's deejay at the time, Mad Chemist, Hush of Da Ruckus, and the now acclaimed producers J Dilla of Slum Village and Mr. Porter.

Being a member of hip hop collectives D12 and Outsidaz, Bizarre had some of his bandmates of both crews to appear on this album. The EP earned Bizarre the Inner City Flava Of The Year award in 1998.

On May 11, 2018, it was announced that Majik Ninja Entertainment would be teaming up with Federation to re-release the EP for its 20-year anniversary. It is set to be reissued on July 27, 2018

Track listing

Note
Track 3 sampled "Prelude in C-Sharp Minor Op.3 No.2" by Sergei Rachmaninoff (1919)

Personnel
Credits adapted from Discogs

Rufus Arthur Johnson - lead vocals
Denaun Porter - vocals & producer (track 2)
Von Carlisle - vocals (track 2)
Marshall Mathers - vocals (track 3)
Fuzz Scoota - vocals (track 3)
Aubrey King - vocals (track 7)
Jerome Hinds - vocals (track 7)
Shakir Nur-al-din Abdullah - vocals (track 7)
Dewayne Battle - vocals & engineer (track 7)
Mad Chemist - additional vocals & producer (track 4)
ABM Nubian - additional vocals (track 2)
Dead Day - additional vocals (track 6)
Kevin Bell - producer (tracks 3, 5, 7), mixing (track 7)
Daniel Carlisle - producer (track 1)
James Yancey - producer (track 6)
Leonard "Lenn Swann" Adams - scratches (track 5)
Chaz Martin - engineer (tracks 1–2, 4-6)
I.V. Duncan - engineer (track 3)
Rob Fwarthout - mixing
DeShaun Holton - mixing (track 7)
Marc Kempf - executive producer, art direction, photography (cover & inside)
Rico Shelton - executive producer
Darrell Williams - executive producer
Bob Martus - photography (inside)

References

1997 debut EPs
Hip hop EPs
Bizarre (rapper) albums
Albums produced by J Dilla
Albums produced by Mr. Porter